Talebabad may refer to:
 Talebabad, Gilan
 Talebabad, Khuzestan
 Talebabad, Mazandaran
 Talebabad, Kashmar, Razavi Khorasan Province
 Talebabad, Tehran
 Talebabad, West Azerbaijan
 Talebabad, Yazd